Songs of the Silver Screen is the fourth Sons of the San Joaquin album and the first for a major label.  Like previous albums, all of the songs were written by or notably recorded by the Sons of the Pioneers.  Unlike the previous release, only one song in this collection can be found on an earlier Sons of the San Joaquin album ("Empty Saddles").

Track listing

Personnel

Sons of the San Joaquin

Jack Hannah
Joe Hannah
Lon Hannah

Additional personnel

Joey Miskulin - accordion
Mark Casstevens - acoustic guitar, arch top guitar
Pat Flynn - acoustic guitar
Craig Nelson - acoustic bass
Sonny Garrish - pedal steel
Rob Hajacos - fiddle
Dennis Burnside - piano, synthesizer
Lonnie Wilson - drums, percussion
"Ranger Doug" Green - Spanish recitation, "Down Where the Rio Flows"

Production

Joey Miskulin - producer
Richard Helm - A&R direction
Patricia Miskulin - production coordinator
Recorded at:
The Reflections and Nightingale Recording Studio, Nashville, TN
Gary Paczosa - engineer
Ed Simonton - assistant engineer
Mixed at:
The Dog House, Nashville, TN
Gary Paczosa - mixer
Toby Seay - assistant mixer
Mastered at:
Georgetown Masters, Nashville, TN
Denny Purcell - mastering
Carlos Grier - digital editing
Laura LiPuma-Nash - art design
William Matthews - watercolor painting
Steven Whatley - design

Track listing and credits verified from the album's liner notes.

References

External links
Official site

1993 albums
Sons of the San Joaquin albums